Kamenka is a rural locality (a village) in Karinskoye Rural Settlement, Alexandrovsky District, Vladimir Oblast, Russia. The population was 9 as of 2010. There are 2 streets.

Geography 
The village is located 17 km south-west from Bolshoye Karinskoye, 21 km south-west from Alexandrov.

References 

Rural localities in Alexandrovsky District, Vladimir Oblast